F is the sixth letter of the Latin alphabet.

F may also refer to:

Science and technology

Mathematics
 F or f, the number 15 in hexadecimal and higher positional systems
 pFq, the hypergeometric function 
 F-distribution, a continuous probability distribution
F-test, a statistical test
 f, SI prefix femto, factor 10−15
 , Fibonacci number

Computing and engineering
 F (programming language), a subset of Fortran 95
 F Sharp (programming language), a functional and object-oriented language for the .NET platform.
 F* (programming language), a dependently typed functional language for the .NET platform.
 F-measure, the harmonic mean of precision and recall
 f, in programming languages often used to represent the floating point
 F connector, used for inlet in cable modems
 F crimp, a type of solderless electrical connection
 F band (NATO), a radio frequency band from 3 to 4 GHz
 F band (waveguide), a millimetre wave band from 90 to 140 GHz

Physics
 °F, degree on the Fahrenheit temperature scale
 F, for farad, a unit for electric capacitance
  or ℱ, the Faraday constant
 , focal length of a lens
f-number (sometimes called f-ratio, f-stop, or written f/), the focal length divided by the aperture diameter
 , frequency
 F (or A), Helmholtz Free Energy
 F, the electromagnetic field tensor in electromagnetism
 Often generalized to include the field tensors of other interactions, as in i.e. the gluon field strength tensor.
F region, part of the ionosphere

Chemistry
 Fluorine, symbol F, a chemical element
 f-block, a block of elements in the periodic table of elements
 F (or Phe), abbreviation for compound phenylalanine

Biology
Form (botany)
Form (zoology)
Bioavailability, which is expressed as the letter "F" in medical chemistry equations
Haplogroup F (Y-DNA), a patrilineal haplogroup
Haplogroup F (mtDNA), a matrilineal haplogroup

Music
F (musical note)
 F major, a scale
 F minor, a scale
 F major chord, Chord names and symbols (popular music)
 f, Forte (music)
F (album), an album by Japanese singer Masaharu Fukuyama
F Album, an album by Japanese duo KinKi Kids
"F", song on the double A-side single "Tsume Tsume Tsume/F" by Japanese metal band Maximum the Hormone

Transport
F Sixth Avenue Local, a rapid transit service of the New York City Subway
F (S-train), trains on the ring line of Copenhagen's commuter train network
F Market & Wharves, a heritage streetcar line operated by the San Francisco Municipal Railway
 The NYSE ticker symbol of the Ford Motor Company
 Ford F-Series, a series of full-size pickup trucks from Ford Motor Company

Military
 F, a class of designation in the United States military aircraft designation systems which stands for "Fighter"
 F, a common designation for fighter aircraft
 Foxtrot, the military time zone code for UTC+06:00
 F band (NATO), a radio frequency band from 3 to 4 GHz

Other uses
 F (film), a 2010 film directed by Johannes Roberts
 France, on the vehicle registration plates of the European Union
 F (grade), a failing grade
 f, the symbol used in the International Phonetic Alphabet for the voiceless labiodental fricative
 f, common abbreviation in lexicons meaning feminine grammatical gender
 Fax, referring to a facsimile machine
 F, abbreviation for fax number
 The citation abbreviation of the Federal Reporter
 F, Fujitsu's mobile phones in Japan
 Forward position in Australian Rules football
 "F" or "F***", sometimes used to censor "fuck".
 f, abbreviation for the social networking service Facebook
 Common abbreviation for floor (for example, "3F" = 3rd floor)
 F word (disambiguation), euphemism for several words beginning with "f"
 Dominical letter F for a common year starting on Tuesday
 F, as an online expression of respects to a recently deceased person (as a reference to the videogame Call of Duty: Advanced Warfare)
F, the production code for the 1964 Doctor Who serial The Aztecs
 "F" Is for Fugitive, the sixth novel in Sue Grafton's "Alphabet mystery" series, published in 1989

See also
 Class F (disambiguation)
F class (disambiguation)
F-sharp (disambiguation)
F type (disambiguation)